Hotspur is a locality in south west Victoria, Australia.

The former 'Rising Sun Hotel' is heritage listed as it is considered of historical and architectural significance to the Glenelg Shire.

Traditional ownership
The formally recognised traditional owners for the area in which Hotspur sits are the Gunditjmara People who are represented by the Gunditj Mirring Traditional Owners Aboriginal Corporation.

References

External links

Towns in Victoria (Australia)